Marius Činikas (born 17 May 1986) is a Lithuanian footballer.

Career 
Činikas had a trial spell with Hearts in February 2009, but he failed to win a contract. He rejoined Hearts for their preseason tour to Germany, but he returned to play for Kaunas in their Europa League qualifiers against FK Sevojno. On 28 August 2009, however, it was announced that he had joined Hearts. Činikas made his debut appearance for Hearts in a 1–1 draw in an Edinburgh derby played on 3 January 2010. He was deployed as a right back. On 1 February 2010, Hearts confirmed he would be returning to FBK Kaunas. In April 2010 he joined FC Partizan Minsk. In March 2011 he signed a contract with FK Liepājas Metalurgs in Latvia.

International career 
He was a regular for the Lithuanian U21 side.

References

External links
 
 
 

1986 births
Living people
Sportspeople from Kėdainiai
Lithuanian footballers
Association football midfielders
Lithuanian expatriate footballers
Expatriate footballers in Scotland
Expatriate footballers in Belarus
Expatriate footballers in Latvia
Expatriate footballers in Estonia
Lithuanian expatriate sportspeople in Scotland
Lithuanian expatriate sportspeople in Belarus
Lithuanian expatriate sportspeople in Latvia
Lithuanian expatriate sportspeople in Estonia
A Lyga players
Scottish Premier League players
Belarusian Premier League players
Latvian Higher League players
Meistriliiga players
FBK Kaunas footballers
Heart of Midlothian F.C. players
FC Partizan Minsk players
FK Liepājas Metalurgs players
FC Minsk players
FK Sūduva Marijampolė players
JK Sillamäe Kalev players
FK Jonava players
FK Atlantas players